Sari Suli (also Romanized as Sārī Sūlī; also known as Sārīlū) is a village in Qeshlaq Rural District, in the Central District of Ahar County, East Azerbaijan Province, Iran. At the 2006 census, its population was 572, in 109 families.

References 

Populated places in Ahar County